Diwaker Pundir (born 11 November 1975 in Hyderabad) is an Indian actor in Bollywood and a model. He has won the title of Graviera Mister India 1998. He was second runner-up at Mr Intercontinental Contest held in Germany.

He holds Commercial Pilot Licence and was a pilot before joining entertainment industry. His father was an Army officer.
He has modelled in many TV commercials of prominent brands such as Lifebuoy soap, Whirlpool refrigerators, Hyundai Verna,
Honda Activa, Skoda Rapid and Parle Bakesmith.

Filmography

Film

Television

Kaali

References 

1975 births
Indian male models
Living people
Male actors from Hyderabad, India
Male actors in Hindi television
Male actors in Hindi cinema
Commercial aviators